The Du Tast Lake is a freshwater body of the municipality of Eeyou Istchee James Bay, in the administrative region of Nord-du-Québec, in the province of Quebec, at Canada.

The surface of the lake is usually frozen from early November to mid-May, however, safe ice circulation is generally from mid-November to mid-April.

Geography 
The lake has 13 small islands, the main one being Kauskwepikach Island.

The "Lake Du Tast" receives on the Southwest side the waters of the Kauskatitineu River and some streams coming from the North-West. The Atikuschekw Marsh is located on the northwestern side of the northern part of "Lake Du Tast". Several marsh areas are located all around the lake.

The mouth of "Lake Du Tast" is located at the bottom of a bay on the eastern shore of the northern part of the lake. This mouth is located at:
 west of the mouth of Dana Lake (Eeyou Istchee Baie-James);
 south-west of the mouth of Evans Lake;
 east of the mouth of the Broadback River (confluence with James Bay);
 north of downtown Matagami.

The "Du Tast Lake" discharge flows on  winding eastwards into marsh areas to the north shore of Dana Lake (Eeyou Istchee Baie-James).

The main hydrographic slopes near Lake Du Tast are:
North side: Broadback River, Rupert River;
East side: Dana Lake (Eeyou Istchee Baie-James), Evans Lake, Broadback River;
South side: Muskiki River, Chabinoche River, Enistustikweyach River;
West side: Colomb Lake, Nottaway River.

Toponymy
The toponym "lac du Tast" (French name) was formalized on December 5, 1968, by the Commission de toponymie du Québec when it was created.

Notes and references

See also 

Broadback River, a watercourse
Evans Lake, a body of water
Dana Lake (Eeyou Istchee Baie-James), a body of water
Eeyou Istchee Baie-James (municipality), a municipality
List of lakes in Canada

Eeyou Istchee James Bay
Lakes of Nord-du-Québec
Broadback River drainage basin